The Baháʼí Faith has an emphasis on what it describes as traditional family values, and marriage between a man and a woman is the only form of sexual relationship permitted for Baháʼís. With an emphasis on chastity and restraint outside of matrimony, Baháʼí practices exclude premarital, extramarital, or homosexual intimacy. Baháʼí institutions have taken no position on the sexual practices of those who are not adherents, and Baháʼís have been discouraged from promoting or opposing efforts to legalize same-sex marriage.

The scriptural basis for Baháʼí practices comes from the writings of Baháʼu'lláh (1817–1892), the faith's founder, who forbade fornication, adultery, and sodomy. The Baháʼí position towards homosexuality was elaborated on by Shoghi Effendi, Baháʼu'lláh's great grandson and appointed head of the religion from 1921 to 1957. He answered specific questions and described homosexuality as an affliction that should be overcome, while leaving Baháʼí membership open to anyone regardless of sexual orientation. This position leaves Baháʼís with a same-sex orientation under similar guidance as a heterosexual person, that is, if they find themselves unable to contract a marriage with someone of the opposite sex, they should remain celibate.

The supreme governing institution of the Baháʼí Faith is the Universal House of Justice, first elected in 1963, which has written more extensively on the subject of homosexuality. For example, they have clarified that Baháʼís should not single out homosexual practice over other transgressions of Baháʼí conduct, should not treat those with a homosexual orientation with disdain or prejudice, and should not attempt to impose their standards on society.

The exclusion of same-sex marriage among Baháʼís has garnered considerable criticism in the western world, where the Baháʼí teachings on sexuality "may appear to be unreasonable, dogmatic, and difficult to apply in Western society". Particularly in the United States, Baháʼís have attempted to reconcile the immutable conservative teachings on sexuality with the otherwise socially progressive teachings of the Faith, but it continues to be a source of controversy. Former Baháʼí William Garlington said the Baháʼí position in America, "can at most be characterized as one of sympathetic disapproval" toward homosexuality, and professor Melissa Wilcox describes Baháʼí teachings as leaving "little room for tolerance of same-sex eroticism", "not given to statements of its disapproval", and "not generally vocally anti-LGBT."

Baháʼí views on sexuality

Baháʼí teachings stress the importance of absolute chastity for any unmarried person, and focus on personal restraint. The Baháʼí Faith, however, leaves the application of laws of social conduct largely up to the individual, and Baháʼís do not advocate for or discriminate against homosexual people.

While in authoritative teachings homosexuality is described as a condition that an individual should control and overcome, Baháʼís are left to apply the teachings at their own discretion, and are discouraged from singling out homosexual practice over other transgressions, such as the consumption of alcohol, or heterosexual promiscuity. Membership in the Baháʼí community is therefore open to lesbian and gay adherents.

The Baháʼí Faith has been described as a religion "ambiguous or contested on the issue of LGBT inclusion". The religion has a strong emphasis on traditional values found in Abrahamic religions, which discourage liberal sexuality.

Baháʼí teachings state that Baháʼís should not treat homosexual people as condemned outcasts, nor expect people who are not Baháʼí to follow Baháʼí laws. The Baháʼí writings teach adherents to treat everyone with respect and dignity, and to eschew an attitude of discrimination and social intolerance toward homosexuals.

The opportunity for civil same-sex marriage was mentioned in a 2010 letter by the Universal House of Justice as being a public issue that is not in keeping with the Baháʼí teachings, but one that Baháʼís "would neither promote nor necessarily oppose."

See also

Homosexuality and religion
Baháʼí teachings

Notes

References

Baháʼí primary sources

. Cited in 

. Cited in 

. Cited in 

. Cited in 

. Cited in 

. Cited in 

. Cited in

Other

Further reading
LGBTQ-Related documents on Baháʼí Library Online
The Baha’i Teachings and Homosexuality - a statement and FAQ from the official website of the Baháʼís of the United States.

Bahá'í belief and doctrine
Baha'i
Homosexuality